Dream Walkin' is the fourth studio album by American country music artist Toby Keith. It was released on June 24, 1997 by Mercury Records, a label Keith had been with since the start of his career in 1993, and was certified gold by the RIAA for sales of 500,000 copies. Four singles were released from the album; in order of release, they were: "We Were in Love", "I'm So Happy I Can't Stop Crying", "Dream Walkin'", and "Double Wide Paradise". Respectively, these reached #2, #2, #5, and #40 on the Hot Country Songs charts, making the first studio album of his career not to produce any Number One hits. After that album's release, Keith departed from Mercury Records, and signed contracts with Dreamworks Records in 1999.

"I'm So Happy I Can't Stop Crying" was originally recorded by British rock artist Sting on his 1996 album Mercury Falling, from which it was released as a single. The version featured here is a duet with Sting, and is Sting's only entry on the country music charts.

"Jacky Don Tucker (Play by the Rules, Miss All the Fun)" was later included in the soundtrack to the 2006 film Broken Bridges, which was also Keith's debut as an actor. It was earlier included in the 2000 movie The Dukes of Hazzard: Hazzard in Hollywood!

A music video was filmed for "Tired", although it was not released as a single.

Track listing

Personnel
Mike Brignardello – bass guitar on all tracks except "I'm So Happy I Can't Stop Crying"
Larry Byrom – acoustic guitar
Dan Dugmore – steel guitar
Paul Franklin – steel guitar
Owen Hale – drums
Dann Huff – electric guitar
Toby Keith – lead vocals
Clayton Ivey – piano
Michael Landau – electric guitar
Brent Mason – electric guitar
Steve Nathan – keyboards
Brent Rowan – electric guitar
Sting – bass guitar and duet vocals on "I'm So Happy I Can't Stop Crying"
Paul Thorn – background vocals on "Double Wide Paradise"
Dennis Wilson – background vocals
Curtis Wright – background vocals
Curtis Young – background vocals

Charts

Weekly charts

Year-end charts

Certifications

References

1997 albums
Toby Keith albums
Mercury Nashville albums
Albums produced by James Stroud
Albums produced by Toby Keith